Life on a String is the sixth studio album by performance artist Laurie Anderson, released in 2001 on Nonesuch Records.

One of Anderson's predominantly musical (as opposed to spoken-word) albums, Life on a String was recorded at the Lobby Studios in New York City under the musical direction of Skúli Sverrisson, and produced by Anderson and Hal Willner. Guest musicians on the album include Van Dyke Parks, Mocean Worker, Mitchell Froom and Lou Reed.

The first three songs, "One White Whale," "The Island Where I Come From," and "Pieces and Parts," were taken from her show Songs and Stories from Moby Dick. The song "Slip Away" is about the death of her father. "Washington Street" is about Washington Street, Manhattan.

Track listing
All tracks composed by Laurie Anderson, except where indicated

 "One White Whale" – 1:58
 "The Island Where I Come From" – 4:08
 "Pieces and Parts" – 3:36
 "Here with You" – 2:22
 "Slip Away" – 5:50
 "My Compensation" – 2:28 (Anderson, Skúli Sverrisson)
 "Dark Angel" – 3:22
 "Broken" – 3:19
 "Washington Street" – 4:41
 "Statue of Liberty" – 4:24
 "One Beautiful Evening" – 5:05
 "Life on a String" – 2:57

Some copies have "Rumba Club" as a bonus track.

Personnel 
Laurie Anderson – vocals, violin, keyboards, percussion
Skúli Sverrisson – musical direction, bass, guitar, keyboards, sounds, percussion programming
Joey Baron – percussion (1), drums (5, 8, 9)
Martin Brumbach – percussion arrangement (11)
Vinicius Cantuária – percussion (12)
Mino Cinelu – percussion (2)
Tim Cobb - double bass (7)
Greg Cohen – arco bass (2)
Danny Frankel – percussion, handclapping (2), box-o-toys (11)
Erik Friedlander – cello (3, 4, 5, 10) 
Bill Frisell – guitar (9)
Mitchell Froom – mellotron (3, 8, 11), claviola (3), wurlitzer (8)
Eyvind Kang – violin (3)
John Kelly – backing vocals (1)
Liheng – baritone banhu (5)
Tom Nelis – vocals (1)
Van Dyke Parks – keyboards, conductor, string arranger (10)
Lou Reed – guitar (11)
Ben Rubin – bells (9)
Peter Scherer – keyboards (5, 8, 12)
Jamshied Sharifi – strings, additional keyboards (5)
Chris Speed – saxophone (2)
David Torn – loops (2)
Cuong Vu – trumpet (2)
Hal Willner – turntables (6), sampling (6, 7)
Mocean Worker – beats, keyboards (11)
Fred Zlotkin, Jeanne Leblanc - cello (7)
Judy Witmer, Karen Dreyfus, Sue Pray, Vincent Lionti - viola (7)
Ann Leathers, Barry Finclair, Carol Webb, Ellen Payne, Enrico Dicecco, Heidi Modr, Jan Mullen, Jean Ingraham, Joel Pitchon, Jonathan Dinklage, Richard Sortomme - violin (7)
Elena Barere - concertmaster (7)
Technical
Produced by Laurie Anderson and Hal Willner
Recorded by Martin Brumbach at The Lobby, New York City
Additional engineers – Bob Brockmann, Dante DeSole, Josiah Gluck, Laurie Anderson
Mixed by Bob Brockman at NuMedia, New York City, except 2 and 10 by Martin Brumbach                   
Mastered by Robert C. Ludwig at Gateway Mastering Studios (Portland, ME, USA)
Executive producer – David Bither
Artwork – Barbara De Wilde
Photography by Victor Schrager
Cover photography – Noah Greenberg

References

2001 albums
Laurie Anderson albums
Albums produced by Hal Willner
Nonesuch Records albums